Mossbourne Community Academy is a coeducational secondary school and sixth form with academy status, located near Hackney Downs off the A104 road, in the Lower Clapton area of the London Borough of Hackney in England.

Buildings
The school was first opened in 2004 on the site of the former Hackney Downs School. The site had been purchased by Sir Clive Bourne who founded the school as one of the first 'City Academies' in England. Bourne commissioned the Rogers Stirk Harbour + Partners to design the new school buildings, which cost £19,000,000

Description
The first principal of the school was Michael Wilshaw, who left the school to become Chief Inspector of Schools In England and head of Ofsted in January 2012. The school opened a sixth form building in September 2009 which cost £7.7 million; they named it in memory after the late Sir Clive Bourne as the "Sir Clive Sixth Form Centre". The school has a specialism in music.

Since its opening Mossbourne Community Academy has been regularly lauded as one of the top performing inner city schools in England, and used as an example of the success of the academy model for schools in general. As of September 2017, the current head of the Academy is Rebecca Warren.

There are 8 houses: Milton, Mandela, Malala, Moore, Blackman, Bevan, Butler and Bronte.

Mossbourne Federation
In September 2014 the Mossbourne Federation was established. The Federation opened a sister school near Victoria Park , Hackney named Mossbourne Victoria Park Academy which operates under similar policies to the original school. As of September 2015 the Federation opened two primary schools, one near the site of the Queen Elizabeth Olympic Park named Mossbourne Riverside Academy and acquired the former Brooke Community School which is currently named Mossbourne Parkside Academy in Hackney Downs.

Alumni
Nahum Melvin-Lambert, who is a professional footballer and has played for Reading and St Patrick's Athletic, studied at Mossbourne.

References

External links
Mossbourne Community Academy official website

Secondary schools in the London Borough of Hackney
Academies in the London Borough of Hackney
Educational institutions established in 2004
2004 establishments in England
Clapton, London
Specialist music colleges in England